Jason Howell Phillips (born October 11, 1966) is the wide receivers coach for the Hamilton Tiger-Cats of the Canadian Football League (CFL). He is also a former American football wide receiver in the National Football League for the Detroit Lions and Atlanta Falcons. He played college football at the University of Houston.

Early years
Phillips attended Ross Sterling High School, where he received All-District and All-Greater Houston honors as a senior quarterback. After high school he joined Taft Junior College, receiving All-Conference honors as a freshman quarterback. He was converted into a wide receiver as a sophomore. In 1987, he transferred to the University of Houston to play under new head coach Jack Pardee. He tallied 99 receptions (led the nation) for 875 yards (led the conference) and 3 touchdowns.

In 1988, the Cougars were employing the run and shoot offense with Andre Ware at quarterback and James Dixon as the second wide receiver. Phillips led the nation in receptions (108), receiving yards (1,444) and receiving touchdowns (15).

Phillips and Dixon also became the first teammates in school history to register 1,000-receiving yards seasons in the same year. They are also the only wide receiver unit in NCAA history to each record over 100 receptions and rank 1-2 in the nation in receiving in the same season.

In 2006, Phillips was selected to the Southwest Conference All-Decade Team for the 1980s. In 2006, he was inducted into the Houston Hall of Honor.

Professional career
Phillips was selected by the Detroit Lions in the 10th round (253rd overall) of the 1989 NFL Draft, who were using the run and shoot offense. He set a franchise rookie record with 10 receptions for 155 yards against the Tampa Bay Buccaneers.

On April 1, 1991, the Atlanta Falcons signed Phillips as a Plan B free agent, who were using the run and shoot offense. He played there for 3 seasons under head coach Jerry Glanville and offensive coordinator June Jones. He was released on August 23, 1994.

In 1995, Phillips reunited with Pardee, his former college coach, in the Canadian Football League with the Birmingham Barracudas and was named to the South All-Star Team. In 1996, he was signed by the Hamilton Tiger-Cats. In two seasons, he posted 136 receptions for 2,029 yards and 16 touchdowns.

Coaching career
On Sunday, December 20, 2015, the University of Kansas announced the hiring of Phillips as their new WR coach.

In October 2018, Phillips joined the Salt Lake Stallions of the newly-formed Alliance of American Football as the WR coach.

On February 7, 2022, it was announced that Phillips had joined the coaching staff of the Hamilton Tiger-Cats as the team's wide receivers coach.

See also
 List of NCAA major college football yearly receiving leaders

References

External links
 Kansas Jayhawks bio

1966 births
Living people
People from Crowley, Louisiana
Players of American football from Houston
Players of Canadian football from Houston
American football wide receivers
American players of Canadian football
Canadian football wide receivers
Taft Cougars football players
Houston Cougars football players
Detroit Lions players
Atlanta Falcons players
Birmingham Barracudas players
Hamilton Tiger-Cats players
Baylor Bears football coaches
Atlanta Falcons coaches
Houston Cougars football coaches
Kansas Jayhawks football coaches
Minnesota Vikings coaches
SMU Mustangs football coaches
Texas State Bobcats football coaches
All-American college football players
Hamilton Tiger-Cats coaches